Julieta Campos (8 May 1932 – 5 September 2007) was a Cuban-Mexican writer.

Life 
Born in Havana, she moved to Mexico in the 1950s after marrying diplomat Enrique González Pedrero. Julieta Campos won the Premio Xavier Villaurrutia for her novel, Tiene los cabellos rojizos y se llama Sabina (1974).

From 1978 to 1982 she was the director of the Mexican chapter of the writers' organisation PEN.

She moved to the state of Tabasco when her husband was elected governor in 1983–1987. In 1989 Campos' husband was appointed director of the Fondo de Cultura Económica (FCE), a publishing concern for which Campos had previously worked as a translator.

During the administration of Andrés Manuel López Obrador as Head of Government of the Federal District, she served in López Obrador's cabinet as the local Secretary of Tourism.

She died in Mexico City, aged 75, on 5 September 2007 from cancer.

Publications
Tiene los cabellos rojizos y se llama Sabina (Translated into English by Leland H. Chambers as She Has Reddish Hair and Her Name Is Sabrina, University of Georgia Press, 1993)
Bajo el signo de IX Bolon
El lujo del Sol
El miedo de perder a Euridíce 
 
Tabasco, un Jaguar Despertado 
¿Qué Hacemos con los Pobres?
La Forza del Destino 
Reunión de Familia
Celina Or the Cats, translator Leland H. Chambers, Kathleen Ross, Latin American Literary Review Press, 1995,

References

External links
Muere la escritora Julieta Campos Obituary, El Universal

1932 births
2007 deaths
Writers from Havana
Writers from Mexico City
Writers from Tabasco
Deaths from cancer in Mexico
Cuban emigrants to Mexico
Mexican women novelists
Mexican translators
20th-century Mexican novelists
20th-century Mexican women writers
20th-century translators